Glycomyces artemisiae is an endophytic bacterium from the genus of Glycomyces which has been isolated from roots of the plant Artemisia argyi from Yesanpo in China.

References 

Actinomycetia
Bacteria described in 2014